Manuela Ímaz (born Manuela Eugenia Ímaz Houglín; June 14, 1979) is a Mexican actress, born in Chilpancingo, Guerrero, Mexico.

Biography 
Manuela began her artistic career as a TV host on the TeleHit channel, where she appeared in El Planeta de Cabeza and Zona Pública.

She had to wait until 2001 for her first opportunity as an actress, when Emilio Larrosa asked her to take part in his telenovela, Amigas y rivales.

Her great performance in the melodrama demonstrated her acting ability to Larrosa, who then invited her to take part in Las Vías del Amor (2002), credited alongside major actors such as Enrique Rocha and Daniela Romo.

After a break, she resumed her career in Corazones al límite (2004), where she played Isadora.

Family 
She has a daughter named Alaya, born in 2003.

Her cousin is film director Rubén Ímaz.

Filmography

Telenovelas
Por Ella Soy Eva (2012)... Patricia Lorca
Rafaela (2010) ... Arely
Llena de amor (2011) .... Fabiola
Sortilegio (2009)... Katia Alanis
Al Diablo con los Guapos (2008)... Marisela Echevarria
Muchachitas como tú (2007)... Raquel
Amar Sin Limites (2006)... Cecilia
Apuesta por un Amor (2004)... Gracia
Corazones al límite (2004)... Isadora
Las vías del amor (2002-2003)... Rosaura
Amigas y Rivales (2001)... Tamara de la Colina
Camila (1998-1999)

Notes

External links 
 

1979 births
Living people
Mexican telenovela actresses
Mexican television actresses
People from Chilpancingo
Actresses from Guerrero